Brachyurophis roperi, also known as the northern shovel-nosed snake, is a species of venomous burrowing snake that is endemic to Australia. The specific epithet roperi refers to the type locality of the Roper River Mission in the Northern Territory. It was formerly considered a subspecies of Brachyurophis semifasciatus.

Description
The species grows to an average of about 37 cm in length. There are dark brown to black bands along the length of the orange to reddish-brown upper body. The belly is whitish.

Behaviour
The species is oviparous with a clutch size of three. It feeds on reptile eggs.

Distribution and habitat
The species’ range extends from Broome in Western Australia, eastwards through the Kimberley region, the Top End of the Northern Territory as far south as Ti-Tree, to Camooweal in western Queensland. It occurs in sandy soils as well as in heavy soils and rocky ranges.

References

 
roperi
Snakes of Australia
Endemic fauna of Australia
Reptiles of Western Australia
Reptiles of the Northern Territory
Reptiles of Queensland
Taxa named by James Roy Kinghorn
Reptiles described in 1931